KLTD (101.7 MHz), branded as "Juan 101.7", is a commercial FM radio station licensed to Killeen, Texas and serving the Killeen-Temple radio market. It airs a Spanish adult hits radio format and is owned by Townsquare Media. The station's studios are located in Temple, and its transmitter is located south of Moody, Texas.

The station was an affiliate of the Dallas Cowboys Radio Network. Monday through Saturday mornings, KLTD previously carried the syndicated "Walton & Johnson Show" from Houston. On weekends, it carried the "Top Rock Countdown" with Sammy Hagar.

History
KLTD went on the air on May 31, 1976, and was licensed to The Lampasas Broadcasting Company owned by Stephen Sampson. The station was branded as "The Great Ones". Group & Broadcasting of Tulsa acquired KLTD in mid 1977.

On October 1, 2010, KLTD changed its format from mainstream rock (as "Eagle 101.7") to sports, branded as "The Ticket".

On March 15, 2013 at 5 PM, the station began stunting as "The Bone" with "music for dogs". The stunt lasted until the following Monday, when a new permanent format debuted as classic hits, branded as "K101.7".

On June 23, 2017, KLTD shifted its format from classic hits to classic rock, branded as "K-Rock 101.7".

On May 17, 2021, KLTD changed its format from classic rock to Regional Mexican, branded as "La Grande 101.7".

In late June 2022, KLTD changed its format from Regional Mexican to Spanish adult hits, branded as "Juan 101.7".

Previous logos

References

External links
KLTD official website

LTD
Radio stations established in 1976
Townsquare Media radio stations
LTD
Adult hits radio stations in the United States